SS Yorktown was launched February 10, 1894, by Delaware River Iron Ship Building and Engine Works, Chester, Pennsylvania for the Old Dominion Steamship Company for the company's overnight New York City/Norfolk, Virginia service. The United States Navy purchased Yorktown on April 21, 1898, to be commissioned as the second USS Resolute, an auxiliary cruiser and transport that saw naval service during the Spanish–American War 1898–1899. The United States Department of War acquired the ship on January 22, 1900, for service as the United States Army Transport (USAT) Rawlins. The ship was sold to the Merchants and Miners Transportation Company of Baltimore, Maryland on July 27, 1901, and renamed Powhatan. Powhatan was wrecked in 1916 and in 1919 rebuilt as the world's first turbo-electric propelled passenger ship Cuba for luxury passenger and express freight service between Florida and Cuba with the Miami Steamship Company beginning service in 1920. Renamed Seneca, the ship burned and sank December 30, 1927, at Hoboken, New Jersey then refloated September 2, 1928, and scrapped.

Over the ship's career she went aground at Santiago, Cuba, then two months later burned and sank at Brooklyn in 1901, collided and sank in 1916 in Chesapeake Bay and finally burned and sank in Hoboken, in 1927.

Construction
Yorktown, an iron-hulled passenger ship, was launched on February 10, 1894, by Delaware River Shipbuilding and Engine Works at Chester, Pennsylvania for the Old Dominion Steamship Company. Yorktown was the last ship on order, and when completed the company warned it would be forced to close for the first time in its history unless new orders were placed, putting the 100 men, down from 1,500 a few years before, out of work with depressive impact on the town of Chester.

Old Dominion Steamship Company service, 1894–1898
The company served ports in the Chesapeake Bay with weekday, overnight freight and passenger service between New York, pier 26, North River, and Norfolk (Old Point Comfort) with routes extending to Richmond, Virginia, and Washington, D.C. Service by Yorktown and sister ship Jamestown was planned to begin April 10, 1894. On March 19, 1898, Yorktown was advertised by the company as the most comfortable way to travel from New York, sailing at 3 p.m. on March 22 and arriving the next morning for a $13 fare that included berth and meals, to see the "Launching of the Great Twin Battleships  and " on March 24, 1898, at Newport News.

United States government service, 1898–1902
The U.S. Navy purchased Yorktown from the Old Dominion Steamship Company on April 21, 1898, for Spanish–American War service commissioning the ship as USS Resolute on May 11, 1898.

United States Navy service, 1898–1899
Resolute departed New York City on May 25, 1898, assigned to cruise between Môle-Saint-Nicolas, Haiti, and Santiago de Cuba, Cuba, in search of the Spanish Navy squadron commanded by Admiral Pascual Cervera y Topete. After calling at Key West, Florida, on June 8, Resolute returned to the southeast Cuban coast to assist the U.S. fleet in scouting, relying on her high speed for protection. She was present on July 3 at the Battle of Santiago de Cuba, steaming eastward to warn United States Army transports of the Spanish squadrons emergence from the harbor of Santiago de Cuba. Subsequently, Resolute transported Spanish prisoners-of-war to the United States, departing the Cuban coast on July 8 for Charleston, South Carolina; Newport News, Virginia; Tompkinsville, New York; and New York City.

Resolute returned to the Cuban war zone late in July engaging Spanish shore batteries at Manzanillo, Cuba, on August 13, but sailed for the United States carrying returning Marines from the First Battalion who had made the first assault landing at Guantánamo Bay. The ship reached New York on August 23 and after inspection continued to Portsmouth Harbor the next day, where the First Marine Battalion was disembarked.

In October, Resolute embarked the Evacuation Commission at Nuevitas, Cuba, for transportation to Havana, Cuba, and Key West, and again to Havana. Then she returned American troops home to the U.S.

Resolute was out of service until December, while being fumigated following an outbreak of yellow fever on board. She then steamed between Havana and Key West on transport missions through March 1899. Her final service was as a marker vessel for the steam trials of the new battleship  at Portsmouth, New Hampshire, from May–September 1899. The ship arrived at Philadelphia, Pennsylvania, on October 2 for decommissioning effective on December 15, 1899, at League Island Navy Yard.

United States Army service, 1900–1902
Resolute was transferred to the United States Department of War on January 22, 1900, for service with the Army Transport Service as the United States Army Transport (USAT) Rawlins. The ship was aground on a coral reef at Santiago, Cuba when on the way to embark the troops of the Tenth United States Infantry destined for New York. Then, on April 10, 1901, Rawlins was to have sailed from New York to Havana, Cuba with miscellaneous cargo, largely horse feed, but caught fire in the engine room with the result of a two alarm fire bringing six engines, two trucks and three fireboats and so much water pumped aboard by 9:30 a.m. that she rolled over, flooded and sank with deck awash at the Army's pier at Pacific Street, Brooklyn. There was no loss of life but four men were overcome by smoke and damage was estimated at $20,000 to refloat and $50,000 to repair. Rawlins was sold to the Merchants and Miners Transportation Company of Baltimore, Maryland on July 27, 1901, for $200,000.

Later career, 1902–1928
The ship was returned to mercantile service in 1902 and operated under the names SS Powhatan, SS Cuba, and SS Seneca.

Powatan

Renamed Powatan the ship began Norfolk, Virginia—Boston, Massachusetts service with the Merchants and Miners Transportation Company. The company is shown in a 1908 railway guide with twenty-four ships and routes extending from Boston to Savannah, Georgia.

At about 8:14 p.m. Both ships were damaged with Powatan beached with ship and cargo a total loss. Court findings were that Powatan, in confused signals, had cut across Telenas course rather than pass port to port with the responsibility for the collision resting entirely with Powatan. On appeal of that decision the Fourth Circuit Court of Appeals dismissed the case and found it "unnecessary to add anything to the full and fair discussion" of the case in the lower court.

Powhatan was declared a total loss by both owners and underwriters and remained unsalvaged for months until World War I demands for shipping and skyrocketing ship values resulted in the hulk being raised and taken into Norfolk, Virginia until a rehabilitation plan was established. Powatan, described as "rusted, wasted hulk of a ship" that "shipping men" described as "the most hopeless" after two years on mud flats, was "yanked" off the mud and towed to New York by Morse tugs escorted as far as Barnegat, New Jersey by osprey with two eggs in a nest in the masthead lamp. At the Morse Dry Dock and Repair Company Brooklyn yard damaged and corroded plates and frames were removed along with all machinery and there "was scarcely a whole shell" by the time the rebuild that converted the ship into the world's first electric drive passenger ship, SS Cuba, began.

Cuba—world's first electric drive passenger ship

The rebuilt Powhatan, renamed Cuba, underwent trials and began operation in late 1920 as the world's first passenger ship with turbo-electric drive and all lighting and auxiliary machinery also being electric. On trials with the propulsion motor delivering full 3,000 horsepower, the ship attained a speed of 17.28 knots.

Cuba was a relatively small ship of 3,580 tons displacement at  draft,  length overall and was not intended by the owners, Miami Steamship Company, to carry any cargo other than automobiles on deck, express freight and some refrigerated fruit with emphasis put of passenger accommodations and spaces—so that Cuba could "well be called a luxurious yacht rather than a passenger steamship". The rebuilding into Cuba was sponsored by Charles L. Dimon, grandson of John Dimon, partner in the firm Smith & Dimon that had designed and built 1845 clipper  and the 1846 clipper , backed by the General Electric Company which Dimon had selected to furnish electrical equipment including the main propulsion. Initial references are for first-class-only service between to Florida ports and Havana, Cuba but later advertisements are for "New York direct to Miami" service leaving New York every Saturday.

Engineering

Motor control was by two levers, one for motor speed and another for forward or reverse.

Two 150-kilowatt General Electric turbo-generator sets provided lighting and power for auxiliary machinery with a half-kilowatt Holtzer-Cabot Electric Company generator providing power for wireless communication with an emergency lighting generator set driven by a gasoline engine on the upper deck. Capstans and winches were all-electric, including the windlass for the two bower anchors of  each. Steering gear, not electric, was steam driven, as were various engineering pumps; main boiler feed pump, auxiliary feed, circulating and air pumps. Two eight ton refrigeration plants were installed forward.

Accommodations

Passenger staterooms, with double berths and private baths, were in the forward superstructure with the dining room furnished with tables seating four. To aid in handling passenger's automobiles the vessel's side auto port was designed to allow the largest limousines then built to be driven, rather than hoisted, aboard. Among the passenger spaces were a card room on the boat deck aft of the officer's quarters and radio room; a smoking room with a large mahogany bar and end-to-end skylight aft of the card room and the Verandah Café aft of the smoking room. The Verandah Café was designed to imitate a typical verandah with running vines and trellis work, furniture in ivory and green and large windows opening to the sea breeze.

Seneca
On December 30, 1927, Seneca burned and sank at Hoboken, New Jersey. She was refloated on September 2, 1928, and subsequently scrapped.

Footnotes

References

Bibliography

External links

 Online Library of Selected Images: USS Resolute (1898–1900)
 Postcard: Arrival of Steamship "Cuba," Key West, Florida – 90 Miles from Havana

1894 ships
Steamships of the United States
Ships built by the Delaware River Iron Ship Building and Engine Works
Passenger ships of the United States
Auxiliary cruisers of the United States Navy
Transports of the United States Navy
Spanish–American War auxiliary ships of the United States
Ships of the United States Army
World War I merchant ships of the United States
Maritime incidents in 1901
Maritime incidents in 1916
Maritime incidents in 1927
Turbo-electric steamships